Jorge Kalú Gastélum Ocampo (born February 28, 1988) is a Mexican former footballer. He last played for Cimarrones of the Ascenso MX.

Club career
Gastélum is a player that came out of the Monarcas Morelia cantera (youth system). Gastélum made his professional debut with Monarcas on 14 March 2008. He was named Clausura 2009 best rookie of the tournament by Federación Mexicana de Fútbol Asociación.

Honours

Individual
 Best Rookie of the tournament: Primera División de México Clausura 2009

External links

1988 births
Living people
Footballers from Sonora
People from Ciudad Obregón
Association football midfielders
Atlético Morelia players
C.F. Mérida footballers
Club Puebla players
Chiapas F.C. footballers
C.F. Pachuca players
Atlas F.C. footballers
Querétaro F.C. footballers
Coras de Nayarit F.C. footballers
Cimarrones de Sonora players
Liga MX players
Ascenso MX players
Liga Premier de México players
Tercera División de México players
Mexican footballers